Zheng Saisai was the defending champion, but chose to participate in Madrid instead.

Zhang Kailin won the title, defeating Peng Shuai in the final, 6–1, 0–6, 4–2, retired.

Seeds

Main draw

Finals

Top half

Bottom half

References 
 Main draw

Kunming Open - Singles